The Winter Room is a Newbery Honor-winning short novel by Gary Paulsen. It is a realistic fiction story about logging and farming, narrated in the first person to two boys by their Norwegian uncle in the "winter room" of a farm in northern Minnesota, United States. Like many of his works, it evokes a harsh rural environment using vivid imagery, and has elements of a coming of age tale.

Reception
According to Hurst,  it is a "brief, intense novel with incredible descriptive scenes", and Schmitz rates it as one of Paulsen's best. 
Publishers Weekly found "Newbery Award-winner Paulsen never disappoints, and proves his talent again in this remarkably good tale."

Release details
1989, USA, Scholastic Press, Pub date ? September 1989, hardback (1st edition)
1989, USA, Orchard Books, Pub date ? October 1989, hardback
1996, USA, Yearling Books, Pub date ? July 1996, paperback
1991, USA, Perfection Learning Prebound, Pub date ? September 1991, hardback
1991, USA, Bantam Doubleday Dell, Pub date ? April 1991, paperback
1995, USA, Yearling Books, Pub date ? February 1995, paperback
1996, ?, Laurel Leaf, Pub date 2 May 1996, paperback
1998, ?, Laurel Leaf, Pub date ? December 1998, paperback
1999, ?, Rebound by Sagebrush, Pub date ? October 1999, hardback
2005, USA, Thorndike Press, Pub date 16 February 2005, hardback (large print edition)

References 

1989 American novels
American children's novels
Novels by Gary Paulsen
Newbery Honor-winning works
1989 children's books